Susan Lubner is an American writer of children's books. She grew up in Bangor, Maine, but currently resides in Wellesley, Massachusetts.

Career 
Her works include "Lizzy and the Good Luck Girl" (November 2018, RP Kids/Hachette Book Group); "The Upside of Ordinary" (October 2012, Holiday House); "A Horse's Tale: A Colonial Williamsburg Adventure" (2008 Abrams, illustrated by Margie Moore); Ruthie Bon Bair: Do Not Go To Bed With Wringing Wet Hair! (2006 Abrams, illustrated by Bruce Whitley) and Noises at Night, (2005 Abrams, co-authored by Beth Raisner Glass, illustrated by Bruce Whitley).

Her stories have been published in Spider Magazine and Highlights. She has presented at conferences such as the National Council of Teachers of English convention and the Massachusetts Library Association Conference.

Bibliography

 The Upside of Ordinary (October 2012) New York City: Holiday House 
 Lizzy and the Good Luck Girl (November 2018) New York City: RP Kids/Hachette Book Group

References

External links
SusanLubner.com

Living people
Year of birth missing (living people)
Simmons University alumni
Writers from Bangor, Maine
Writers from Massachusetts
American children's writers
American women children's writers
21st-century American women